Mesonia maritima is a Gram-negative, aerobic and rod-shaped bacterium from the genus of Mesonia which has been isolated from seawater from the South Sea.

References

Flavobacteria
Bacteria described in 2017